The 1968 Sacramento State Hornets football team represented Sacramento State College—now known as California State University, Sacramento—as a member of the Far Western Conference (FWC) during the 1968 NCAA College Division football season. Led by eighth-year head coach Ray Clemons, Sacramento State compiled an overall record of 8–3 with a mark of 4–2 in conference play, placing second in the FWC. The team outscored its opponents 245 to 137 for the season. The Hornets played home games at Hornet Field and Charles C. Hughes Stadium in Sacramento, California.

This was the second time Sacramento State had been invited to a bowl game, the previous being the Camellia Bowl in 1964.

Schedule

References

Sacramento State
Sacramento State Hornets football seasons
Sacramento State Hornets football